A second-order cone program (SOCP) is a convex optimization problem of the form

minimize  
subject to

 is the Euclidean norm and  indicates transpose.

SOCPs can be solved by interior point methods and in general, can be solved more efficiently than semidefinite programming (SDP) problems. Some engineering applications of SOCP include filter design, antenna array weight design, truss design, and grasping force optimization in robotics. Applications in quantitative finance include portfolio optimization; some market impact constraints, because they are not linear, cannot be solved by quadratic programming but can be formulated as SOCP problems.

Second-order cone 
The standard or unit second-order cone of dimension  is defined as

.

The second-order cone is also known by quadratic cone, ice-cream cone, or Lorentz cone.

The set of points satisfying a second-order cone constraint is the inverse image of the unit second-order cone under an affine mapping:

and hence is convex.

The second-order cone can be embedded in the cone of the positive semidefinite matrices since

i.e., a second-order cone constraint is equivalent to a linear matrix inequality (Here  means  is semidefinite matrix). Similarly, we also have,

.

Relation with other optimization problems 

Convex quadratically constrained quadratic programs can also be formulated as SOCPs by reformulating the objective function as a constraint. Semidefinite programming subsumes SOCPs as the SOCP constraints can be written as linear matrix inequalities (LMI) and can be reformulated as an instance of semidefinite program. The converse, however, is not valid: there are positive semidefinite cones that do not admit any second-order cone representation. In fact, while any closed convex semialgebraic set in the plane can be written as a feasible region of a SOCP, it is known that there exist convex semialgebraic sets that are not representable by SDPs, that is, there exist convex semialgebraic sets that can not be written as a feasible region of a SDP.

Examples

Quadratic constraint 
Consider a convex quadratic constraint of the form

This is equivalent to the SOCP constraint

Stochastic linear programming
Consider a stochastic linear program in inequality form

minimize  
subject to

This problem can be expressed as the SOCP

minimize  
subject to
 

where  is the inverse normal cumulative distribution function.

Stochastic second-order cone programming
We refer to second-order cone programs
as deterministic second-order cone programs since data defining them are deterministic.
Stochastic second-order cone programs are a class of optimization problems that are defined to handle uncertainty in data defining deterministic second-order cone programs.

Solvers and scripting (programming) languages

References

Optimization algorithms and methods
Convex optimization